The Lockheed Martin AN/AAS-35(V) Pave Penny is a laser spot tracker carried by US Air Force attack aircraft and fighter-bombers to enable them to track a laser spot on the ground. It is a receiver only, allowing the pilot to see which targets may be attacked by any laser-guided bombs they carry.

Pave Penny does not produce a laser beam and cannot be used to designate targets. It was designed to be used with designators on the ground or on other aircraft. PAVE was later used as an acronym for Precision Avionics Vectoring Equipment.

Description
The Pave Penny was developed in the mid-1970s based on the earlier AN/AVQ-11 Pave Sword laser tracker used on a few USAF F-4 Phantom IIs during the Vietnam War, miniaturized using solid-state electronics.

The compact (31 in / 78 cm) pod, which weighs only 32 lb (14.5 kg) is a simple laser spot tracker that searches for reflected laser light from other laser designators (used by friendly air or ground forces) and displays that target information on the aircraft heads-up display (HUD). Unlike the laser ranger and marked target seeker systems common to European aircraft, or the more sophisticated ASQ-228 ATFLIR, TIALD, and LANTIRN designators, the Pave Penny does not contain a laser. It can recognize specific laser designation signals based on pre-determined four-digit codes encoded into the laser pulse, allowing it to seek out particular targets and ignore others (to avoid, for example, several aircraft hitting the same target). There is no range-finding capability. The Pave Penny's nominal range is 20 miles (32 km), although effective range is considerably shorter.

The Pave Penny pod was used by USAF A-7D Corsair II aircraft, fuselage-mounted beneath the engine intake, and the A-10 Thunderbolt II, mounted on an external pylon designed specifically for the pod. It was previously used by some F-16 aircraft, although most now use the LANTIRN system instead which permits self-designation. Some pods were also supplied to Singapore, where they were used on that nation's A-4SU Super Skyhawks.

See also
Pave Tack
Pave Knife
Pave Spike

Citations

External references
Lockheed Martin AN/AAS-35(V) Pave Penny laser tracker. Jane's Electro-Optic Systems, January 5, 2009

External links
Pave Penny production order. Flight International, 10 July 1975.
Pave Penny page on GlobalSecurity.org

Targeting pods
Equipment of the United States Air Force
Military electronics of the United States
Military equipment introduced in the 1970s